Hyposmocoma nephelodes is a species of moth of the family Cosmopterigidae. It was first described by Lord Walsingham in 1907. It is endemic to the Hawaiian island of Oahu and possibly Maui. The type locality is the Waianae Range.

External links

nephelodes
Endemic moths of Hawaii
Moths described in 1908